This is a list of the more than 2,000 properties and historic districts in the U.S. state of Georgia that are listed on the National Register of Historic Places. Listings are distributed across all of Georgia's 159 counties.  Listings for the city of Atlanta are primarily in Fulton County's list but spill over into DeKalb County's list.

Current listings by county

The following are tallies of current listings by county.

See also

 List of National Historic Landmarks in Georgia (U.S. state)
 List of bridges on the National Register of Historic Places in Georgia

References

Georgia